Walter Schürmeyer (1889–1976) was a German librarian.  He served as Library Director at the Bibliothek für Kunst und Technik ("Library of Arts and Technology"), in Frankfurt.

Works 
 “Aufgaben und Methoden der Dokumentation”, in: Zentralblatt für Bibliothekswesen 52 (1935), S. 533–543. (31. Versammlung deutscher Bibliothekare, Tübingen 1935)
 Holzschnitt und Linolschnitt. 9th edition. Ravensburg: Maier, 1973.

1889 births
Date of birth unknown
Place of birth unknown
1976 deaths
Date of death unknown
Place of death unknown
German librarians